Walter George Spencer OBE, FRCS, (27 September 1858 – 29 October 1940) was president of the History of Medicine Society of the Royal Society of Medicine from 1926–1928. He was surgeon to Westminster Hospital and was known as "The Historian of Westminster".

Selected publications
 Outlines of Practical Surgery. Balliere Tindall, 1898.

References 

Presidents of the History of Medicine Society
Members of the Order of the British Empire
Fellows of the Royal College of Surgeons
English surgeons
1858 births
1940 deaths
Physicians of the Westminster Hospital